Do Qaleh-ye Berashk (also Romanized as Do Qal‘eh-ye Berāshk and Do Qal‘eh-ye Berashk; also known as Qal‘a Barāsh, Qal‘eh Barāsh, and Do Qal‘eh) is a village in Sefid Sang Rural District, Qalandarabad District, Fariman County, Razavi Khorasan Province, Iran. At the 2006 census, its population was 149, in 36 families.

References 

Populated places in Fariman County